Bray  may refer to:

Places

France
Bray, Eure, in the Eure département
Bray, Saône-et-Loire, in the Saône-et-Loire département 
Bray-Dunes, in the Nord département 
Bray-en-Val, in the Loiret département 
Bray-et-Lû, in the Val-d'Oise département
Bray-lès-Mareuil, in the Somme département 
Bray-Saint-Christophe, in the Aisne département
Bray-sur-Seine, in the Seine-et-Marne département
Bray-sur-Somme, in the Somme département
Pays de Bray, a watershed in Normandy

Ireland
Bray, County Wicklow
Bray Daly railway station
Bray Male School, former name of Saint Cronan's Boys' National School
Bray Head, a hill just south of Bray, Wicklow
Bray Head, Kerry, a hill on Valentia Island, County Kerry
Bray Lower, a townland of County Kildare
Bray Upper, a townland of County Kildare

United Kingdom
Bray, Berkshire, a village near Maidenhead
Bray Shop, a village in Cornwall
River Bray

United States
Bray Place, a 1796 home and farmstead, Louisville, Kentucky
Bray Township, Pennington County, Minnesota
Brays, Missouri
Bray, Oklahoma

Other places
Bray, South Australia, a locality In Australia
Bray, Wallonia, a village in the municipality of Binche, Belgium
Bray, Botswana, a village in Kgalagadi District, Botswana
Bray, North West, a village in the North West province of South Africa
Bray Island, a Canadian Arctic islands in Nunavut, Canada

People
Bray (surname)
Bray (musician) (born 1972), American musician and singer-songwriter

Other uses
5182 Bray, a minor planet
Bray Castle, former name of Lewes Castle, Lewes, East Sussex, England
Bray People, a tabloid published in Northern Ireland
Bray Productions, an American animation studio
Bray Magazine (1922–1923), a theatrical cartoon series
Bray Studios (UK), British film studio
Bray Unknowns F.C., an Irish association football club
Bray Wanderers A.F.C., an Irish league football (soccer) club
Braying, the call of a donkey
USS Bray (DE-709), a destroyer escort of the United States Navy

See also
 Brae, a village on the island of Mainland in Shetland, Scotland
 Bray House (disambiguation)
 Bray Park (disambiguation)
 Braye (disambiguation)
 Brey (disambiguation)
 De Bray (disambiguation)
 People v. Bray, a 1975 case decided by the California Court of Appeal
 Vicar of Bray (disambiguation)